Lumbini FC was a 
Nepali professional association football club based in Butwal, Rupandehi. It last competed in the Nepal National League in 2015.

Football clubs in Nepal
2015 disestablishments in Nepal